The 390s decade ran from January 1, 390 to December 31, 399

Significant people
Arcadius, Eastern Roman Emperor
Honorius (emperor), Western Roman Emperor

References